The 2000 Exeter City Council election took place on 4 May 2000, to elect members of Exeter City Council in England. The entire council was up for election following boundary changes, which increase the number of seats from 36 to 40. The election was held concurrently with other local elections in England. The Labour Party retained control of the council, which it had held since 1995.

Results summary

Ward results

Alphington (3)

Cowick (2)

Duryard (2)

Exwick (3)

Heavitree (2)

Mincinglake & Whipton (2)

Newtown (2)

Pennsylvania (2)

Pinhoe (2)

Polsloe (2)

Priory (3)

St. Davids (2)

St James (2)

St Leonards (2)

St. Loyes (2)

St Thomas (2)

Topsham (2)

Whipton & Barton (3)

References

2000 English local elections
2000
2000s in Exeter